Mixtape Messiah 4 is the fourth mixtape by American rapper Chamillionaire in his Mixtape Messiah series. It is a two-disc set that was released on August 27, 2008.

Track listing

(Disc 1)

TriviaIn track 4, "Roll Call Reloaded", Chamillionaire impersonates the rappers he claims are hot right now. He proceeds in this order: Young Jeezy, Jim Jones, Lil Wayne, Plies, E-40, B.G., Rick Ross, Rich Boy, Snoop Dogg, Bun B, The Game, Jay-Z and The-Dream.

(Disc 2)

References

2008 mixtape albums
Chamillitary Entertainment albums
Chamillionaire albums
Sequel albums